Iqbal Mahmood is a retired Bangladeshi civil servant. He served as Chairman of the Anti-Corruption Commission, Bangladesh.

Early life and education 
Mahmood was born in Faridganj, Chandpur, Bangladesh in 1955. He had his preliminary schooling in Assasuni High School, Satkhira. He completed Intermediate studies (H.S.C) from Notre Dame College, Dhaka.
He completed his BS and MS degrees in Public Administration from University of Dhaka. He also holds another master's degree in policy studies from the University of New South Wales, Australia with a specialization in international policy analysis and development. He completed his Ph.D. in public administration too.

Career 
Mahmood joined the civil service as a member of the Bangladesh Civil Service Administration Cadre in January 1981, and has since held various positions in the government of Bangladesh. He served as a Senior Secretary to the People's Republic of Bangladesh before his retirement from the civil service. He has worked with the Government of Bangladesh in different capacities from January 1981 to November 2014. He held top level positions in different ministries (Finance, Public Administration, Communications & Railways, and Posts & Telecommunications) of the Government.

References 

Bangladeshi civil servants
Political office-holders in Bangladesh
1955 births
Living people
Notre Dame College, Dhaka alumni
University of Dhaka alumni
University of New South Wales alumni
People from Chandpur District